The Thailand Ladies Open was a professional golf tournament in Thailand on the Ladies Asian Golf Tour. It featured on the Ladies European Tour in 2005.

History
The first event was played at the inception of the Ladies Asia Golf Circuit in 1987. The 26th edition in 2013 was won by Thailand amateur Sherman Santiwiwatthanaphong on her 17th birthday. The 2011 event required a long playoff between Cho A-ram and Tanaporn Kongkiatkrai until the 19-year-old Kongkiatkrai made a birdie on the ninth playoff hole to claim victory.

Winners
Ladies Asian Golf Tour event (2006–2013) 

Source:

Ladies European Tour event (2005)

Source:

Ladies Asia Golf Circuit event (1987–2003) 

Source:

See also
Thailand Open

References

External links
Ladies Asian Golf Tour
Ladies European Tour
Thailand Ladies Open - Past Champions, Thai Ladies Golf Association

Ladies Asian Golf Tour events
Former Ladies European Tour events
Golf tournaments in Thailand